Batangas is a province in the Philippines.

Batangas may also refer to:

 Batangas (sword)
 Batangas City
 Batangas Bay
 Batangas International Port, locally known as Batangas Pier
 Butterfly knife, commonly known as a "Balisong" and often referred to as a "Batangas knife"

See also
 
 Batanga (disambiguation)